Carex flava, called hedgehog grass, is a widespread species of sedge (genus Carex), native to the northern United States, Canada, Iceland, Europe, the Atlas Mountains in Africa, the Transcaucasus area, and parts of Siberia. It is the namesake of the Carex flava species complex.

References

flava
Taxa named by Carl Linnaeus
Plants described in 1753